Supervillains is a 1982 superhero role-playing game published by Task Force Games.

Gameplay
Supervillains is a game of role-playing and tactical combat in modern-day New York City.

Reception
Steve List reviewed Supervillains in The Space Gamer No. 56. List commented that "While super-powered villains are the stuff of comic books, a game about them must be designed at a level demonstrating more sophistication than a comic book.  SV fails in this regard.  Mr. Register has a vivid imagination, but has failed to translate his ideas into a coherent form.  Coupled with this is the typical lack of care shown by TFG in proofreading, editing, and organizing their products.  The combination is deadly.  Avoid Supervillains."

Reviews
 Different Worlds #23 (Aug., 1982)

References

Superhero role-playing games
Task Force Games games